Joaquim da Silva Neves (born December 24, 1970) is a former Portuguese footballer who played as a defender.

Honours
Taça de Portugal: 1997–98
Supertaça Cândido de Oliveira: 1991

References

External links 
 
 

1970 births
Living people
People from Santo Tirso
Portuguese footballers
Association football defenders
Primeira Liga players
C.D. Aves players
FC Porto players
S.C. Braga players
Gil Vicente F.C. players
C.F. Os Belenenses players
C.S. Marítimo players
S.C. Salgueiros players
Portugal international footballers
Sportspeople from Porto District